Taouila is a town and commune in Laghouat Province, Algeria. According to the 1998 census, it has a population of 2,634.

References

Communes of Laghouat Province